Nathan Frankel (November 3, 1913 – March 14, 2006) was a professional basketball player. He spent one season in the Basketball Association of America (BAA) as a member of the Pittsburgh Ironmen during the 1946–47 season, but he spent the majority of his playing career as a member of teams in the American Basketball League (ABL). He attended Brooklyn College.

BAA career statistics

Regular season

External links

1913 births
2006 deaths
American Basketball League (1925–1955) players
American men's basketball players
Brooklyn Bulldogs men's basketball players
Detroit Eagles players
Forwards (basketball)
Guards (basketball)
Pittsburgh Ironmen players
Samuel J. Tilden High School alumni
Brooklyn College alumni